Thantoli is a village in Pauri Garhwal district in the Indian state of Uttarakhand.

Geography 
It is a 2 hour road journey from Rishikesh by local transport. Nearby places include Raneth (0.7 km), Mitrgram (1.4 km),  (1.5 km), Banni (1.5 km), Kathur (2 km), and Silogi (6.8 km).

Demographics 
Many people of sub caste of Garhwal like Kandwal, Kukrety, Badola, and Dobhal live in the village. More than 30 families live there as of 2020.

Infrastructure 
Village is equipped with electricity, water and a 4g network.

Culture 
The temple of Siddhpeeth Godeshwar Mahadev sits among the rosewood trees on the picturesque mountain. Godyu Chhichhada (waterfall) is a tourist destination.

Godeshwar Mahadev Temple and Godeu Chichhada (waterfall) are a tourist destination.

References

Villages in Pauri Garhwal district